Barta'a is a town in Israel and the Palestinian territories that straddles both sides of the Green Line in the Wadi Ara (or Nahal 'Iron) region.

Western Barta'a is in the Haifa District of Israel, and forms part of the Basma local council. Its 4,700 residents are Arab citizens of Israel.

Eastern Barta'a is in the Palestinian territories in the northern part of the Jenin Governorate of the West Bank in what was designated under the Oslo Accords as Area C. It has 3,600 residents, of whom 30-40 percent carry Israeli identity cards and the rest of whom carry Palestinian identity cards.

History

Early history
Ceramics from the Byzantine era have been found in Barta'a.

Ottoman era
In 1882, the PEF's Survey of Western Palestine described it as "a ruined Arabic village on a high hill, with a spring in the valley to the north 400 feet below." The village of Barta'a was established in the middle of the 19th century by members of the Kabha tribe. According to oral traditions, the tribe moved in the middle of the 18th century from Bayt Jibrin to Ya'bad. In the middle of the 19th century, some of the Kabhaites left Ya'bad in search of a living area and purchased the land of Barta'a, where they found a spring and grazing land. In time, Barta'a developed and was built around it by satellite villages, also belonging to the sons of Kabha: Umm al-Qutuf, 'Ein al-Sahala, Wadi' Ara and Tura al-Arabiya.

British Mandate era
In the 1922 census of Palestine, conducted by the British Mandate authorities, Barta'a had a population of 468, all Muslim, increasing in the 1931 census to 692, still all Muslims, in 94 houses.

In the 1945 estimates, the village plus Khirbat Tura el Gharbiya had a population of 1,000 Muslims with 20,499 dunams of land, according to an official land and population survey. 464 dunams were used for plantations and irrigable land, 1,957 dunams for cereals, while 1,900 dunams were non-cultivable land.

After Israeli Independence
After the 1948 Arab-Israeli War, the village of Barta'a was divided by the 1949 armistice into eastern and western parts. The western part fell under Israeli control, while the eastern part fell under Jordanian control. From 1949 to 1967, travel between the two halves was practically impossible. In the armistice agreements at the end of the War of Independence, the village was divided into two, on the basis of the Wadi al-Umiya outline, which crosses the village and constitutes a convenient natural border. Its north-western part was transferred to Israel with about a third of the population (500 people), while its eastern-southern part, which is located on the hilltop, was incorporated into Jordan with about 1,000 residents. The distance between the houses of Barta'a in Israel and the houses of Barta'a in Jordan was a few dozen meters and in some places only a few meters. In the first years after the 1948 War the villagers moved almost freely between the two parts of the village. The residents of Barta'a used to go to the mosque in the Jordanian section, and the mukhtar was in charge of the two parts of the village. As a result, the village was a convenient place for meetings between Israeli Arabs and their relatives who lived in the Jordan. In May 1955, the Jordanian authorities evacuated the refugees who settled in East Barta'a from the area, in order to make it difficult to smuggle into Israel. In March 1956, a serious border incident occurred in which an Israeli policeman and four Arabs from Jordan were killed. During the incident, most residents of East Barta'a fled their homes.

Following the 1967 Six-Day War, Israel captured the West Bank and the two parts of the town were informally reunited, operating as one municipal unit. Since many of the residents in both parts of the town belong to the same extended family (the Kabha family), the de facto "reunification" was viewed positively by town residents. Residents of East Barta'a began to work in Israel and agriculture became a source of secondary income. Thanks to the proximity to Israel, the standard of living in East Barta'a rose faster than in the rest of the West Bank. In 1978, East Barta'a was connected to electricity from generators, and in 1984, it was connected to the Israeli electricity grid. Barta'a students study at high schools in Ya'abed and Jenin, In 1995, an outline plan for East Barta'a, intended to meet the expansion needs of East Barta'a by 2015, came into effect.

Following the second intifada, the village of Barta'a became an important commercial center for the residents of Wadi Ara and a large part of the Galilee residents to buy cheap goods at the prices of the Palestinian Authority after the entry of Israelis into the West Bank, Many businessmen from the West Bank relocated their businesses to East Barta'a as part of the Palestinian Authority but have access to and proximity to the target market for goods in the Wadi Ara area. With the construction of the separation fence, East Barta'a was included in an enclave located on the Israeli side of the fence, and the trend of Israelis traveling to Barta'a for cheap shopping increased. Many of the houses in the village became stores and warehouses for merchandise, and many of the villagers became rich. However, there were also allegations of harm to residents of the village who are forced to move to the towns of Yabed and Jenin via an IDF checkpoint.

The development of Barta'a into an important commercial center resulted in many workers' from the West Bank settling in the village regularly. This led to social tension between foreign workers and residents, who saw workers as a threat to their livelihood. In addition, the prolonged stay of workers, most of whom are young without families, has long been viewed by many as a threat to the conservative customs of the residents. In the absence of recreation and welfare centers in the village, workers tend to spend their free time on the streets of the village and next to the residential areas of the local residents. The proximity between parts of Barta'a was exploited by the terrorist organizations to smuggle people into the State of Israel. For example, the suicide bomber who carried out the attack at the Maxim restaurant crossed the Green Line in Barta'a.

Barta'a enclave

The Israeli West Bank barrier passes east of Barta'a, separating the town from the rest of the West Bank. The portion of the town lying outside Israeli territory (Eastern Barta'a) is in what is known as the Seam Zone, an area between the Green Line and the barrier. Other towns and villages in this enclave include Umm ar-Rihan, Khirbet 'Abdallah al-Yunis, Khirbet Ash-Sheikh Sa'eed, Khirbet al-Muntar al-Gharbiya, Khirbet al-Muntar ash-Sharqiyya, and Dhaher al-Malik. There are no checkpoints to the west on the border with Israel, but long-term residents of the Barta'a enclave who do not have Israeli citizenship face fines if they leave the enclave to venture into Israel.

Access from the Barta'a enclave to the West Bank is through two entry/exit gates: Barta'a and Shaked. People who want to enter the enclave must also apply for a permit.

The market in the Barta'a enclave has become a hotspot for customers from Israel. Because the residents do not live under Israeli social system, products are cheaper than in Israel. The area is accessible for Palestinians and Israelis, and thus has become a kind of free-trade zone.

See also
West Bank closures

References

Bibliography

External links
Google map
Survey of Western Palestine, Map 8: IAA, Wikimedia commons 
UNRWA Profile of Barta'a Sharqiya Enclave
Haaretz article on Barta'a entitled, "A Surreal Visit to an Arab Israeli Town Straddling a Contested Border for the Last 50 Years"
Salon article on Barta'a entitled, "Another Brick in the Wall"
 Times of Israel article on Barta'a, entitled "Town on Israeli-Palestinian border finds a good balance"
Barta'a's entry at Palestine Remembered

Seam Zone
Villages in the West Bank
Jenin Governorate
Haifa District
Wadi Ara
Divided cities
Populated places in Haifa District